Primal is a 2010 Australian horror film directed by Josh Reed, and starring Zoe Tuckwell-Smith, Krew Boylan, Lindsay Farris, and Wil Traval.

Premise
A group of friends (Anja, Mel, Dace, Chad, Kris, and Warren) venture into the Australian outback where Dace, an anthropology student, wants to study ancient symbols placed outside a mysterious cave. They are later attacked by a bizarre, aggressive, and sharp-toothed rabbit, which manages to wound Kris before it is killed by the gang. Confused, the group returns to their camp. Later that evening, Mel, one of the girls, goes skinny dipping into a local pond but is attacked by leeches. At night, she gets an extraordinarily high fever, her teeth start falling out, and she bleeds uncontrollably. The following day, armed with knife-like teeth, superhuman strength, savage and animalistic behaviour and hunger for flesh, the now mutant Mel attacks her friends. They attempt to detain and subdue her, but she escapes, killing Warren and eating him. In an attempt to run away from Mel, Dace hides in the same pond, but Anja, Kris, and Chad frantically get him out of the water. Thinking that the leeches carry the parasite that turned Mel "primal" and finding no leeches on Dace, they assume Dace is safe.

That night, as the survivors plot their escape, Dace suddenly gets the same sickness Mel experienced before becoming "primal". The friends debate who kills their friend before he mutates. However, sensing Dace's imminent transformation (and probably a male partner to mate with), the mutant Mel attacks the survivors and saves Dace and hides him where he can "die" and transform safely before they get the chance to kill him. The group still finds Dace, but Mel succeeds in protecting him because of Chad's refusal to accept that Mel, his girlfriend, is dead and the parasite is all that remains of her. The reanimated and mutant brainless Dace chases Kris. Then, the mutant Dace and Mel meet for the first time as fully transformed mutants and they "sacrifice" Kris into the cave. Anja figures out that the mutants are afraid of the cave for some reason. So, Chad and Anja, the two remaining survivors, hitch a plan to escape by passing through the cave.

As the two attempt to scurry past the two mutants as they feast on what remains of their friend Warren, their plan falls apart when the mutant Dace and the mutant Mel begin to have sex. Despite Anja warning Chad that "it's not them anymore", the sight triggers so much jealousy and anger in Chad that he attacks the mutants. Both mutant Dace and Chad are killed in the ensuing battle. Anja flees and ventures into the cave, where she discovers Kris, who has been impregnated by a monster, presumably the source of the parasites in the pond. Kris slices her own stomach to kill the "child" while Anja kills the monster itself. Later, in the morning, Anja encounters the mutant Mel one last time. In their duel Anja paralyzes Mel by kicking her into a tree and snapping her spine. Anja kills Mel by grabbing a big rock and dropping it on Mel's head, crushing her skull.

Cast

Reception
Primal received positive reviews from critics, earning a 75% approval rating on Rotten Tomatoes based on eight reviews, with a weighted average score of 6.1/10.

References

External links
 
 

2010 films
2010 horror films
2010s exploitation films
2010 horror thriller films
Australian horror thriller films
Films set in Australia
Films shot in New South Wales
Australian natural horror films
2010s English-language films